Without Pity may refer to:
 Without Pity (1948 film), an Italian film
 Without Pity (2014 film), an Italian crime-thriller film
 Without Pity: A Film About Abilities, a 1996 American television documentary film